Martien J.H. Kas (born 27 November 1966, Uithoorn) is associate professor in the Department of Translational Neuroscience, Brain Center Rudolf Magnus, at the University Medical Center Utrecht, where he leads a work group entitled "Translational Behavioral Genetics" that researches cross-species behavioral genetics to better understand origins and develop treatments for psychiatric disorders.

He is president of the Dutch Behavioural Genetics Association, board member and treasurer of the Dutch Neuroscience meeting and the Dutch Neurofederation, and executive committee member of the European College of Neuropsychopharmacology.

Career
Kas received his B.A. in medical microbiology from the Leidse Hoge School, a M.Sc. in biology, with specialization in neurobiology, psychopharmacology, and ethology from the Vrije Universiteit Amsterdam, and a Ph.D. in behavioral neuroscience from Stanford University and the University of Groningen. He completed a postdoctoral fellowship at the University Medical Center Utrecht and was a visiting scientist at the Social, Genetic and Developmental Psychiatry Research Centre at the Institute of Psychiatry (London).

By applying interspecies genetic analysis of neurobehavioral traits (in mice and humans), Kas' research aims to identify functional genotype–phenotype relationships relevant to the development and etiology-directed treatment of brain disorders, such as schizophrenia and autism spectrum disorders.

Kas is president of the Dutch Behavioural Genetics Association, a member of the organizing committee of the International Behavioural and Neural Genetics Society meeting, member of the Steering Committee and treasurer of the Dutch Neuroscience meeting, board member and treasurer of the Dutch Neurofederation, and executive committee member and coordinator of the annual Young Scientists Workshop of the European College of Neuropsychopharmacology.

Honors
Kas has received a Marie Curie Fellowship as principal investigator. He received a VIDI grant as principal investigator on a project studying interspecies genetics of neurobehavioral traits in mice and men. Most recently, he was co-awarded an Innovative Medicines Initiative project for Translational Endpoints in Autism (EU-AIMS).

Publications
Kas has published extensively, with numerous peer-reviewed articles and book chapters to his name.

References

1966 births
Living people
Dutch neuroscientists
Academic staff of Utrecht University
University of Groningen alumni
Vrije Universiteit Amsterdam alumni
People from Uithoorn